Ghilamara Model Higher Secondary School is a Higher Secondary School situated in Ghilamara Lakhimpur Assam. It was Established in 1952.

Infrastructure
 a Library
 an Office Chamber
 Two Entrance Gates
 a Science Library
 a cultural Stage
 a flower garden
 a play ground
 a computer room

Other informations 
 Block Name - Bordoloni Block 
 Medium - Assamese
 Language subjects - Assamese , English
 Building Type - Government Model
 No. of Books in Library app. - 1400
 No. of Teachers app. - 30
 Classes - class VI to XII

Notes

High schools and secondary schools in Assam
1982 establishments in Assam
Organizations established in 1982